Jim Champion may refer to:
 Jim Champion (gridiron football)
 Jim Champion (rugby league)